The Accessible Canada Act (long title: An Act to ensure a barrier-free Canada, Loi visant à assurer un Canada sans obstacles) (ACA) builds on the Canadian Human Rights Act, focusing on the prohibition of discrimination based on disability. Carla Qualtrough presented Bill C-81 for its final reading on June 21, 2019, where it received Royal Assent. This is a Canada-wide accessibility act that applies to the federal public sector, Crown Corporations, and all federally regulated organizations. It is the first national Canadian legislation on accessibility that affects all government departments and federally regulated agencies. The federally regulated organizations include the following industries:
 railways, airplanes and inter-provincial buses
 banks, mining companies, railways, airlines, and trucking
 television and radio

Preparation
The Office of Public Service Accessibility (OPSA) was responsible for preparing Bill C-81 and creating its implementation strategy. OPSA's mandate will expire in March 2021.

Standards development
Accessibility standards required for the Accessible Canada Act (ACA) are to be developed by Accessibility Standards Canada (ASC). Priority areas for have been defined as: Employment; Emergency measures; Built environment including parks and outdoor recreation facilities; Information and communication technologies; Indigenous accessibility; Accessible communications.

Legislated roles
The ACA created the position of an Accessibility Commissioner and Chief Accessibility Officer. The Accessibility Commissioner has the authority to fine organizations up to $250,000 per violation.

The Accessibility Commissioner has broad powers to conduct investigations of complaints. If the complaint is substantiated, they have the power to order the appropriate corrective measures and pay compensation to the complainant.

Mandates and goals

As defined, the ACA will require the public sector to:
 hire 5,000 new employees who identify as people with disabilities over five years (1,000/year);
 review anything which may be a barrier for the public or the public sector;
 create an initial accessibility plan by one year after a date determined by regulations;
 publish an updated accessibility plan, and notify the Accessibility Commissioner, on an annual basis outlining progress to-date. This plan must be made available to people on request.
 consult persons with disabilities in the preparation of its accessibility plan and include the manner of consultation in the report.

In the Backgrounder on Accessible Government provided by Employment and Social Development Canada (ESDC), several other items have been outlined which pertain to the public sector. Perhaps the most immediate will be the five-year commitment for the public sector to hire a thousand employees per year who identify as people with disabilities.

The government will be investing $53 million over six years, in support of a new Strategy for an Accessible Government of Canada. An "Accessibility Hub" will also be established to provide leadership, coordination and oversight. The details of this strategy and "Accessibility Hub" will be developed and released to the public within one year of the passage of the legislation.

Public Services and Procurement Canada will establish an accessible procurement resource centre. The government will adjust its policies to ensure that goods and services procured by the Government of Canada are accessible.

The vision of the ACA is to be the most accessible and inclusive public service in the world. The guiding principles are:
 Nothing without us: Persons with disabilities are involved in the design and implementation of the strategy.
 Collaboration: Departments and agencies work in collaboration with each other as well as with bargaining agents, and other public, private, and not-for-profit organizations.
 Sustainability: The strategy prioritizes actions that will have a long-term impact.
 Transparency: The strategy is developed and implemented in a transparent manner and departments will report openly and transparently on their efforts to remove barriers.

The five most-pressing goals defined in ACA include:
 Improving recruitment, retention, and promotion of persons with disabilities
 Enhancing the accessibility of the built environment
 Making information and communications technology usable by all
 Equipping public servants to design and deliver accessible programs and services
 Building an accessibility confident public service

Many details are under development.

Enforcement
Representatives from the five organizations responsible for enforcing the ACA make up the Council of Federal Accessibility Agencies (CFAA) along with the Accessibility Commissioner. The five lead organizations are:
 Canadian Transportation Agency
 Canadian Radio-television and Telecommunications Commission (CRTC)
 Canadian Human Rights Tribunal
 Federal Public Sector Labour Relations and Employment Board
 Canadian Human Rights Commission

These organizations are committed to working together, viewing accessibility as a fundamental human right to be realized across Canada.

National AccessAbility Week
The Bill named National AccessAbility Week as the week starting on the last Sunday in May. This is part of an effort to change the public sector's culture, and celebrate Canadians with disabilities.

Upcoming dates for this event:
 2020: May 31 to June 6
 2021: May 30 to June 5
 2022: May 29 to June 4
 2023: May 28 to June 3
 2024: May 26 to June 1
 2025: May 25 to May 31

Implementation

On April 1, 2020, the Policy on Service and Digital will come into effect in the Government of Canada. This will make the Chief Information Officer (CIO) of Canada responsible for prescribing enterprise-wide information and data standards for accessibility. The requirements and direction specified by the CIO will guide the deputy heads to ensure their development and delivery.

Organizations which fall under the ACA will need to build accessibility plans, incorporate accessible feedback tools and create annual progress reports to mark progress on accessibility.

Having measurable progress is a key part of the ACA. OPSA is responsible for developing the strategy and supporting its implementation across all government departments.

See also 
 Ontarians with Disabilities Act for the corresponding Ontario provincial legislation.
 Nova Scotia Accessibility Act for the corresponding Nova Scotia provincial legislation.
 The Accessibility for Manitobans Act for the corresponding Manitoba provincial legislation.
 Newfoundland and Labrador Accessibility Act for the corresponding Newfoundland and Labrador provincial legislation.
 The Accessibility for Saskatchewan Act for the corresponding Saskatchewan provincial legislation.
 Accessible British Columbia Act for the corresponding British Columbia provincial legislation.
 Disability Discrimination Act for the corresponding UK legislation.
 Americans with Disabilities Act of 1990 for the corresponding American federal legislation.

References

External links
 Accessible Canada Act (S.C. 2019, c. 10) - Justice Canada
 Making an accessible Canada for persons with disabilities
 Canada's pending accessibility law comes off as the Liberals just fulfilling an election promise
 Canada's first accessibility bill could become law next month
 An Overview of Canada's Accessibility Laws: A Look at the Old and the New
 A Complete Overview of Canada's Accessibility Laws
 Review of Accessibility Canada Act by Council of Canadians with Disabilities
 Accessible Canada Act in Plain Language
 Nothing Without Us and the Accessible Canada Act by Sheri Byrne-Haber
 Behind the Scenes Development of the Accessible Canada Act – AccessibiliTV

2019 in Canada
2019 in Canadian law
Anti-discrimination legislation
Canadian federal legislation
Disability in Canada
Disability legislation
Disability law in Canada
Anti-discrimination law in Canada